Besboro Island is a small island in the Norton Sound, Bering Sea, off the shores of Alaska.

Besboro island stretches from north to south and is only 2 miles in length and a half mile across at its widest. Administratively, this island belongs to the Nome Census Area, Alaska. It is owned by the Unalakleet Native Corporation (90%) and the Shaktoolik Native Corporation (10%). It is used by the locals for subsistence and recreational activities and by deep water vessels for safe harbor in stormy weather. The tidal sand spit that stretches off the northeast corner is a haul out area for seal.

This island was named on September 12, 1778, by Captain James Cook(1785, v. 2, p. 479), RN, who published it as "Besborough Island." It is part of the Bering Sea unit of the Alaska Maritime National Wildlife Refuge.

References

External links
 Birdlife
 Picture

Islands of the Bering Sea
Islands of Alaska
Islands of Nome Census Area, Alaska
Alaska Maritime National Wildlife Refuge
Protected areas of Nome Census Area, Alaska
Islands of Unorganized Borough, Alaska